A suicide bombing occurred on 12 April 2002 at a bus stop located at the entrance to the Mahane Yehuda Market which is Jerusalem's main fruit and vegetable market. The site of the attack was chosen in order to cause maximum number of casualties. 6 civilians were killed in the attack and 104 were injured. The al-Aqsa Martyrs' Brigades claimed responsibility for the attack.

The attack
On Friday, 12 April 2002, Andalib Suleiman, a Palestinian 17-year-old female suicide bomber, detonated an explosive device hidden on her body shortly after 4:00 pm at a bus stop located at the entrance to the popular outdoor market, killing six civilians and injuring 104 people, many of them teenagers and tourists. She was initially misidentified as Nidal Daraghmeh from Jenin.

During the attack Jerusalem Mayor at the time Ehud Olmert was visiting at the Mahane Yehuda Market.

The perpetrator first attempted to enter the market, but found security too tight. She then went to Jaffa Road and attempted to board a bus, but was prevented from boarding and set off her bomb, which was packed with nails to inflict maximum damage on victims. The bus was torn to pieces by the impact.

Rather than wearing an explosive belt, Andalib carried a black handbag that contained three plastic pipes filled with explosives and nails connected to a battery. She belonged to the Tanzim as well as the al-Aqsa Martyrs' Brigades. In her final video she was dressed in black and holding a Koran while she stated that she was about to die as a symbol of the woman's fight against occupation, and that it was her desire to finish the work that had been started by her two cousins, and to honor the memory of Wafa Idris, Darine Abu Aisha, and Ayat al-Akhras. Two Chinese construction workers were killed in the attack.

Muataz Muhammed Abdallah Himouni (21), of Hebron, arrested on 6 May 2002 claimed credit for planning the attack, supplying the bomber with explosives, and directing her to blow herself in a crowd at the Mahane Yehuda market or nearby Jaffa Road.

Youssef Moughrabil, along with Muhataz Muhammed Abdallah Himouni and Marwan Saloum, planned and trained Andalib for the attack. Taleb Amr, known more commonly as Abu Ali, a Tanzim military activist supplied the weapons and the explosives for Andalib. Hours before the attack Andalib met with Himouni and Saloum to learn how to detonate the bomb. On Friday April 12, 2002 Andalib was driven to Abu Dis where she took a taxi to Jerusalem. From there Andalib went to the outside market Mahane Yehuda and detonated the bomb at a bus stop.

The suicide bomber lived in the village of Beit Fajar, sixteen kilometers south of Bethlehem, where her entire family clan the Takatka resides. Her two cousins Iman Takatka, age seventeen, and Samia Takatka, age twenty-one, were captured by Israeli security forces as they prepared to carry out suicide bombings at Jerusalem's Mahane Yehuda market. The girls were taken to an Israeli prison and in response to the attempted attack, their family's home was demolished by the IDF, and Andalib witnessed this. Intelligence reports indicate that Andalib was impregnated by a Fatah operative, despite being unmarried, and that the emotional and social consequences of her unplanned pregnancy directly influenced her decision to carry out a suicide bombing.

Perpetrator Andalib Suleiman Takatka (Andaliv Takatka) was the fourth Palestinian female suicide bomber. She killed six people, seven including herself, and injured over forty at a bus stop on Jaffa Road outside of the open-air Mahane Yehuda market in Jerusalem on April 12, 2002.[1] Rather than wearing an explosive belt, Andalib carried a black handbag that contained three plastic pipes filled with explosives and nails connected to a battery. She belonged to the Tanzim as well as the al-Aqsa Martyrs' Brigades. In her final video she was dressed in black and holding a Koran while she stated that she was about to die as a symbol of the woman's fight against occupation, and that it was her desire to finish the work that had been started by her two cousins, and to honor the memory of Wafa Idris, Darine Abu Aisha, and Ayat al-Akhras. Two Chinese construction workers were killed in the attack.

Impact
A scheduled meeting between American Secretary of State Colin Powell and Palestinian Authority President Yasser Arafat was cancelled as a result of the bombing.

See also
 1997 Mahane Yehuda Market Bombings

References

External links
"Terrorist responsible for planning April 12 suicide bombing in Jerusalem arrested during Operation Defensive Shield", Israeli Ministry of Foreign Affairs; accessed 6 May 2002.
 Suicide bomber strikes bus stop in downtown J'lem; injuries reported, Haaretz, 12 April 2002.
 Young Women in Suicide Terrorism
 The involvement of women in suicide bombing attacks
 Terrorist responsible for planning April 12 suicide bombing in Jerusalem arrested during Operation Defensive Shield

Mass murder in 2002
Suicide bombing in the Israeli–Palestinian conflict
Terrorist attacks attributed to Palestinian militant groups
Terrorist incidents in Jerusalem
2002 in Jerusalem
April 2002 events in Asia
2002 deaths
Palestinian casualties in the Second Intifada
Palestinian female murderers
Female suicide bombers
Palestinian mass murderers
Terrorist incidents in Jerusalem in the 2000s
Marketplace attacks in Asia